Omphalolappula is a genus of flowering plants belonging to the family Boraginaceae.

Its native range is Australia.

Species
Species:
 Omphalolappula concava (F.Muell.) Brand

References

Boraginoideae
Boraginaceae genera